"Bad Time" is a song recorded by American singer Sabrina Carpenter from her third studio album Singular: Act I (2018). It serves as the sixth track of the album and was released by Hollywood Records as the second promotional single on November 1, 2018. The track was written by Carpenter, Julia Karlsson and its producer, Oscar Görres. The song is about someone who is calling for a "good time", but the invitation is denied.

Background and recording

"Bad Time" was written and recorded in November 2017 at Wolf Cousins Studios in a day and a half, by the time Carpenter was in Stockholm, Sweden. It was written by Sabrina Carpenter, Julia Karlsson and Oscar Görres, the last being the song's producer and vocal producer. Carpenter, Karlsson and Görres served the background vocals and Görres programmed the song and played keyboards, bass, guitars, drums and percussion. The song was mixed by Serban Ghenea at MixStar Studios in Virginia Beach, Virginia and John Hanes served as a mix assistant. The song was mastered at Sterling Sound in New York City by Chris Gehringer.

Composition and lyrical interpretation
Musically, "Bad Time" is a three minutes and five seconds up-tempo synth-driven song with electropop influences. Lyrically, the song talks about someone who's calling for a "good time", but the invitation is denied because, previously, that person has already messed with Carpenter's mind.

Critical reception
The Line of Best Fit called the song "an undeniable highlight [and] also perhaps the best example of the lyricism and pop sensibility Carpenter brings to [Singular: Act I] as a whole, creating image-heavy scenarios that are then exploded into a chorus with sticky hooks and a massive pay-off." Mike Neid for Idolator described the song as "funny".

Credits and personnel
Recording and management
Recorded at Wolf Cousins Studios (Stockholm, Sweden)
Mixed at MixStar Studios (Virginia Beach, Virginia)
Mastered at Sterling Sound (New York City)
Wolf Cousins (STIM) Warner/Chappell Music Scand (STIM), Seven Summits Music (BMI) obo Itself and Pink Mic Music (BMI), Warner/Chappell Music Scand (STIM)

Personnel

Sabrina Carpenter – vocals, songwriting, background vocals
Oscar Görres – songwriting, production , vocal production, programming, keyboards, bass, guitars, drums, percussion, background vocals
Julia Karlsson – songwriting, background vocals
Serban Ghenea – mixing
John Hanes – mix assistant
Chris Gehringer – mastering

Credits adapted from Singular: Act I liner notes.

Release history

References

2018 songs
Sabrina Carpenter songs
Songs written by Oscar Görres
Songs written by Sabrina Carpenter